Ovtsharenkoia is a monotypic genus of Asian tree trunk spiders containing the single species, Ovtsharenkoia pallida. It was first described by Yuri M. Marusik & Victor R. Fet in 2009, and has only been found in Central Asia.

References

Hersiliidae
Monotypic Araneomorphae genera
Spiders of Asia